Nigeria Union of Teachers is a major trade union in Nigeria. It was formed to create a united front for practitioners of the teaching profession in the country. Major objectives of the union covers the improvement in economic conditions of teachers, an avenue for bringing forth ideas about the educational development of the country from the perspectives of teachers and general economic security for teachers in the country.

History
The union was formally inaugurated in 1931, it came about partly as a result of vulnerabilities exposed by the great depression, which led to cuts in teachers salaries and a seemingly lack  job security. 

The use of irregular and unpredictable educational codes for teachers and salary cuts led to an increase in teachers associations mushrooming in various southern Nigerian cities, particularly in Calabar, Lagos, and Abeokuta. The various associations, however, realized that harmonizing the objectives of the groups to bring about a united front will create a powerful vocal union for the interest of the teachers. On July 8, 1931, the teachers associations of Lagos, Agege, Abeokuta, Ibadan, Calabar and Ijebu-Ode joined together to form the Nigeria Union of Teachers. The first president of the group and chairman of the July 1931 meeting was the late Oludotun Ransome Kuti, the husband of Funmilayo Ransome-Kuti and father of Fela Anikulapo Kuti. On May 27, 1972, the union merged with the Northern State Teachers Union, an association founded by Aminu Kano and a few northern Nigerian teachers in 1948. To some extent, the union has live up to it expectation as it has provided an umbrella body for the teachers of the country. Several strike actions were embarked upon at the instances of the union. The fact remains that could we say that union has served as a body for the realisation of the objectives of the establishment of the body?
The follower from the north gave rise to the northern Teaches Association

References
Boniface I. Obichere; Studies in Southern Nigerian History

Trade unions in Nigeria
Education in Nigeria
Education trade unions
Trade unions established in 1931